Gilu Joseph is a Malayali poet and lyricist. She earlier worked as an air hostess with Fly Dubai. She has also acted in Malayalam movies.

Personal life 
Gilu hails from Kumily in Idukki district in Kerala. She has two sisters. She moved to Dubai at the age of 18 to work as cabin crew with Fly Dubai.

Gilu appeared on the cover of the March edition of Grihalakshmi, breastfeeding a baby as a part of their 'breastfeed freely' campaign. A complaint was lodged with the State Child Rights Commission against the magazine and Gilu, by various lawyers. A petition was filed with the Kerala HC alleging that the magazine cover violated provisions of the Protection of Children from Sexual Offenses Act (POCSO), However, the court did not agree with the petitioner's allegation. The court observed that 'obscenity lies in the crotch of the beholder'.

Work 

Gilu has penned the lyrics for Malayalam songs in the following movies
 Vaarikkuzhiyile Kolapathakam (2019)
 Ottamuri Velicham (2017)
 Adam Joan (2017)
 C/O Saira Banu (2017)
 Sathya (2017 Malayalam film) (2017)
 2 Penkuttikal (2016)
 Lailaa O Lailaa (2015)

Plays 
 Hand of God

Filmography

Awards 
She was awarded the Palm Pusthakapura Akshara Thoolika award for her poetry.

References

External links
 

Living people
Year of birth missing (living people)
People from Kerala
Malayalam poets
Actresses in Malayalam cinema